US Post Office-Boonville is a historic post office building located at Boonville in Oneida County, New York, United States. It was designed and built in 1937, and is one of a number of post offices in New York State designed by the Office of the Supervising Architect of the Treasury Department, Louis A. Simon.  It is a one-story, five bay building with a poured concrete foundation and brick facades in the Colonial Revival style.  It features a hipped roof surmounted by an octagonal cupola with metal window tracery and an iron weathervane. The interior features a mural painted by the McCullough sisters of New York City depicting a 19th-century scene on the Black River Canal.  It is a contributing structure within the Boonville Historic District.

It was listed on the National Register of Historic Places in 1988.

References

Boonville
Government buildings completed in 1937
Colonial Revival architecture in New York (state)
Buildings and structures in Oneida County, New York
Individually listed contributing properties to historic districts on the National Register in New York (state)
National Register of Historic Places in Oneida County, New York